Arthur A. Koscinski (April 1, 1887 – November 21, 1957) was a United States district judge of the United States District Court for the Eastern District of Michigan.

Education and career

Born in Posen, German Empire, (now Poznań, Poland), Koscinski emigrated to the United States and received a Bachelor of Laws from the University of Michigan Law School in 1910. He was in private practice in Detroit, Michigan from 1910 to 1945. He was a public administrator for Wayne County, Michigan from 1923 to 1936, and was a member of the Detroit City Pension Commission from 1934 to 1937, and then of the Michigan Public Trust Commission from 1937 to 1938. He was a government appeal agent for the Selective Service Board from 1940 to 1945. He was a member of the Michigan Constitutional Revision Commission in 1941, and a member of the Board of Wayne County Institutions from 1942 to 1943.

Federal judicial service

On June 4, 1945, Koscinski was nominated by President Harry S. Truman to a seat on the United States District Court for the Eastern District of Michigan vacated by Judge Arthur J. Tuttle. Koscinski was confirmed by the United States Senate on July 17, 1945, and received his commission on July 18, 1945. He assumed senior status on April 30, 1957. Koscinski served in that capacity until his death on November 21, 1957.

References

Sources
 

1887 births
1957 deaths
German emigrants to the United States
University of Michigan Law School alumni
Judges of the United States District Court for the Eastern District of Michigan
United States district court judges appointed by Harry S. Truman
20th-century American judges